is a Japanese mecha anime franchise created by Xebec in collaboration with Starchild Records. The story focuses on a group of children who pilot the titular Fafners in an escalating war against giant aliens called Festum. The first series, subtitled Dead Aggressor, is directed by Nobuyoshi Habara and written by Yasuo Yamabe and Tow Ubukata with character designs from Hisashi Hirai and mecha designs by Naohiro Washio. It aired on TV Tokyo from July to December 2004 for 26 episodes. A television special subtitled Right of Left aired in December 2005, a feature film subtitled Heaven and Earth had a theatrical release in Japan in December 2010, and a sequel subtitled Exodus aired on MBS and several other stations for 26 episodes from January to December 2015. Another sequel subtitled The Beyond was released as four films from May 2019 to November 2021. A special episode subtitled Behind the Line premiered in theaters in January 2023. The series heavily borrows elements from Norse Mythology, referencing some of the terminology used.

Synopsis

Dead Aggressor (2004)
At the beginning of the Dead Aggressor story arc, much of the world has been destroyed by the Festum and the remote Japanese island of  has only remained unscathed by virtue of an advanced cloaking shield. The island's young people continue with their daily lives unaware of these events, but after many years of peace, a lone Festum discovers Tatsumiya and attacks. The adults activate Tatsumiya's hidden defense systems and attempt to repel the attacker but to no avail. Many of them are killed by the Festum in a process of assimilation. In desperation, they order the deployment of a mecha called the Fafner Mark Elf, but its pilot is killed en route to the hangar. Left with no further options, they send a young boy named Kazuki Makabe as the replacement pilot assisted by Sōshi Minashiro from within the Siegfried System.

The Festum is destroyed, but with Tatsumiya Island's whereabouts exposed, the adults choose to relocate the island. Production is accelerated on additional Fafner units and more children are recruited to pilot them. It is also revealed that the cloaking was not meant to conceal Tatsumiya Island from only the Festum, but from the rest of humanity who would seek to use its technology in the greater war against them.

Right of Left (2005)
A prequel to the first series. Yumi Ikoma and Ryou Masaoka are children who have been selected to take part in a top secret mission, to be the pilots of the first Fafner combat units; the last chance of survival for the human race. The enemy is ruthless, remorseless and is able to read the minds of humans. Therefore, the details of this mission are kept a secret even from the personnel involved. The young pilots must use all their courage and faith in order to survive and complete their mission or the fate of mankind would be compromised.

Heaven and Earth (2010)
The year is 2148. Two years after the end of the original Fafner in the Azure TV series, Tatsumiya Island and its surviving residents have returned to some semblance of recovery. However, things have become desperate for our hero, Kazuki; nearly blind now, and partially crippled from his battles with the Festum two years earlier, he clings to the promise his fallen friend Sōshi made to him to return to the island and set things right again. Kazuki's hopes flare when a lifeform is detected within an unmanned submarine that comes floating into Tatsumiya Bay one night, but the person aboard isn't Sōshi; it is a mysterious "boy" named Misao Kurusu who may not be entirely human, and who claims to have been sent by Sōshi. With Misao's arrival, hostilities break out anew between the Human Army and the Festum, and the Fafner pilots are thrown into the most desperate battle of their lives - this time, with the fate of TWO races riding on their shoulders.

Exodus (2015)
2150 A.D. The fight against the Festum, a silicon-based alien life form that destroyed much of the world, enters a new phase. The first Azure Operation crushed the Arctic Mir, scattering its pieces around the world. Soon those fragments began to act of their own volition. While the majority of the Mir wage war, embracing a hatred for mankind, some of the Festum chose to co-exist with humanity. There were humans who also thought it was possible. Mankind and the Festum, co-existing. The concept questioned the very reason for the war, giving birth to even more hatred. This is no longer simply a fight between humans and the Festum.

Under such circumstances, Tatsumiya Island disappeared from the front lines, going silent. Through the encounter with Misao Kurusu two years ago, the island had the means to converse with the Mir. It gave the island a unique capability. The children of ALVIS, prepared for battle, sought a way to better understand the enemy.

And now, a new chapter is about to begin on the island. A girl who understands the Festum language. A girl the Festum protected. When the two meet, they will open the door to a new world...

Media

Anime
 

Fafner in the Azure: Dead Aggressor aired on TV Tokyo from July 4, 2004, to December 26, 2004. It features two pieces of theme music and one insert theme. angela performed the opening theme entitled "Shangri-La", the insert theme "Proof" in episode 15, and the ending theme "Separation". Sōkyū no Fafner: RIGHT OF LEFT, a 50-minute prequel special to the television series, aired on December 29, 2005. The ending theme "Peace of Mind" for the special was also performed by angela. The TV series was originally licensed by Geneon under the shortened title, Fafner, but has since been out of print. 

A film, titled Fafner in the Azure: Dead Aggressor: Heaven and Earth premiered in Japan on December 25, 2010. Once again, angela performed all theme songs (image, opening and insert) for the film. "FORTUNES" and "Rikai to Hakai e no Prelude (Prelude to Comprehension and Destruction)" are used as the image theme songs for the movie. "Sōkyū (Azure)" is used as ending theme and "Sayonara no Toki Kurai Hohoen de (At Least, Smile When We Are Saying Goodbye)" is used as insert theme for the movie.

A twitvideo post from lead vocalist Atsuko announced that a sequel to the Fafner in the Azure series has been green-lit for production. The announcement was originally made at the live streaming event, Soukyuu Sakusen, which was for the film. The sequel, titled, Fafner in the Azure: Dead Aggressor -EXODUS-, aired on MBS and several other stations from January 8, 2015, to December 26, 2015. It takes place two and a half years after Heaven and Earth. 

A sequel, titled Fafner in the Azure: The Beyond, was announced at the Sōkyū no Fafner Soshi Minashiro Birthday Festival in Yokohama on December 29, 2016. A teaser trailer of the sequel was officially streamed on January 6, 2017. A teaser trailer of the sequel was officially streamed on January 6, 2017. Staff from the previous series worked on the production. The series was later confirmed to be a 12-episode anime series, with the first three episodes premiering in theaters on May 17, 2019. Episodes four to six premiered on November 8, 2019. Episodes seven to nine premiered on November 13, 2020. Episodes ten to twelve premiered on November 5, 2021.

On December 27, 2021, a spinoff anime episode titled Fafner in the Azure: Behind the Line was announced, featuring the returning staff and cast. It premiered in theaters on January 20, 2023.

At New York Anime Festival/New York Comic Con 2011, Funimation Entertainment had announced that both the original TV series and the Heaven and Earth film were licensed, and they were released on DVD and Blu-ray in 2012. The series made its North American television debut on the Funimation Channel on October 29, 2012.

Light novel
A novelization of the Dead Agressor series written by Tow Ubukata and featuring illustrations by Hisashi Hirai was published on January 10, 2005. It was published in English by Digital Manga Publishing on July 22, 2008.

Manga
Two manga adaptations of the Dead Aggressor story have been released and they both share the same title as the first TV series.

The first one is illustrated by Mikami Akitsu. It ran in Dengeki Daioh magazine from July 4, 2004 to December 26, 2004 and was collected into two tankōbon volumes by MediaWorks. Digital Manga Publishing licensed this manga for release in North America and published the volumes on July 7, 2010, and April 30, 2011.

The second one is illustrated by Tomomi Matsushita. It was serialized in Kodansha's Monthly Shōnen Sirius magazine from September 26, 2014 to February 26, 2018, and transferred to Kodansha and pixiv's Palcy manga app in 2018, where it ended on August 25, 2021. It was collected into nine tankōbon volumes.

Music and Drama CD
Numerous soundtracks, drama CDs and character CDs have been released for the series.

Fafner features music composed by Tsuneyoshi Saito and performed by the Warsaw Philharmonic Orchestra.

Japanese band angela consistently write and perform all of Fafner's opening, insert and ending theme songs that achieve strong sales and popularity. They also released a Fafner tribute album titled "Yakusoku" (約束, lit. "Promise") on December 25, 2008, celebrating the series' fifth anniversary.

Video games
Fafner in the Azure was adapted into a video game released for the PlayStation Portable in early 2005, being one of the first releases for the platform. It follows the storyline of the first season almost directly with two bonus missions and also features new weapons such as the dimension gun.

In 2009, the series made its debut into the long-running Super Robot Wars series as a part of Super Robot Wars K for the Nintendo DS. It returned in 2013 in Super Robot Wars UX for the Nintendo 3DS, which also marks the debut of the series' movie sequel, Heaven and Earth.

See also
 Fafnir - a character in Norse Mythology who turns himself into a dragon to protect its treasure.
 Fenrir - a monstrous wolf in Norse Mythology who is foretold to kill the god Odin during the events of Ragnarök.
 Mjölnir - Hammer of the god Thor, one of the most fearsome weapons in Norse Mythology.

Notes

References

External links
 Sōkyū no Fafner: Dead Aggressor Official Japanese website 
 Sōkyū no Fafner: Heaven and Earth Official Japanese website 
 Sōkyū no Fafner: Heaven and Earth  Official English website 
 Sōkyū no Fafner: EXODUS Official Japanese website 
 Sōkyū no Fafner: EXODUS  Official English website 
 
 Sōkyū no Fafner: Dead Aggressor Official Chronology 

2004 anime television series debuts
2005 Japanese novels
Alien invasions in television
Anime with original screenplays
Animeism
Comics set in the 22nd century
Dengeki Bunko
Dengeki Comics
Digital Manga Publishing titles
Funimation
Geneon USA
IG Port franchises
Light novels
Mecha anime and manga
Odex
Shōnen manga
Television series set in the 22nd century
Xebec (studio)
TV Tokyo original programming
Mainichi Broadcasting System original programming